The Entrepreneurship & Innovation Center is a center created to promote Innovation and Entrepreneurship at the University of Florida. The center is part of the Warrington College of Business and is located in Bryan Hall.  Around 2500 students are enrolled in classes over the course of the school year.  The center works with six other colleges at the university to deliver introductory and specialized courses for both undergraduate and graduate students. Courses taught through the center include Creativity, Global Entrepreneurship, Entrepreneurial Marketing, New Venture Creation, Venture Finance, Entrepreneurial Selling and Social Entrepreneurship.

The center has several programs for undergraduate and graduate students as well as for faculty to promote the concept of entrepreneurship.  Several initiatives that the center has started has raised awareness for both entrepreneurship and innovation in both the community of Gainesville, Florida and throughout the country.

Programs / Concentrations
 Thomas S. Johnson Master of Science in Entrepreneurship
 On-Campus Traditional Master of Science in Entrepreneurship
 Online Master of Science in Entrepreneurship
 GatorNest
 Social Entrepreneurship & Sustainability Initiative
 Young Entrepreneurs for Leadership & Sustainability High School Summer Program
 Internships

Events & Activities
 Veterans Entrepreneurship Program 
 Experiential Classroom
 Gator100
 TEDxUF
 JumpstART
Gainesville Entrepreneurship & Adversity Program
 Entrepreneurship and Empowerment in South Africa (EESA)
 Big Idea Gator Business Plan Competition 
 Entrepreneur of the Year
 S. Clark Butler Entrepreneurship Award

Student organizations
 CEI Ambassadors
 Entrepreneurship Club (eClub)
TedxUF
 TED Club
 Change the World

External links
Official website
Official GatorNest website

References

Entrepreneurship organizations
Educational institutions established in 1926
University of Florida
1926 establishments in Florida